Robert Brush is an American writer-producer and composer, best known for his work as executive producer, writer and show runner of ABC's The Wonder Years. For The Wonder Years he received an Emmy for individual writing, the Peabody Award, and multiple Humanitas Awards. He wrote, developed and produced the CBS hit series Early Edition, and ABC's Karen Sisco, as well as adapting for television the novels The Prince of Tides and Scruples (miniseries).

Career
Brush began his career as a musical composer following his graduation from Yale, where he was Pitchpipe of the Yale Whiffenpoofs. In the 1970s he worked at Sesame Street and Captain Kangaroo, writing scripts and composing songs, among them the Good Morning Captain theme song. In 1981 he composed the score for the Broadway musical The First, about baseball immortal Jackie Robinson, which ran for 70 performances at the Martin Beck Theatre. In 1986 he teamed with writer/producer Jay Tarses on The Days and Nights of Molly Dodd, starring Blair Brown, and The Slap Maxwell Story with Dabney Coleman. Beginning in 1988 he executive-produced and wrote The Wonder Years for its run of over 100 episodes, and followed with Early Edition, starring Kyle Chandler. Other projects include Raising Caines, 111 Gramercy Park, and No Ordinary Girl.

Brush returned to New York to pursue his love of literature and is completing a series of novels. His first novel, The Piazza: Stories from Piazza Santa Caterina Piccola, is currently available for pre-order and will be released August 1, 2022.

Brush lives in Manhattan and Hudson, NY with his wife, actress and writer Mel Harris. They have four children.

Writer
The Wonder Years (1988–93)
The Facts of Life (1985)
Growing Pains (1986)
Duet (1987)
The Slap Maxwell Story (1987)
The Days and Nights of Molly Dodd (10 episodes, 1987–1989)
Square One Television (1992)
Raising Caines (1995)
Early Edition (1996-1998)
Ed (1 episode, 2000)
Karen Sisco (2 episodes, 2003)
111 Gramercy Park (2003)
Scruples (miniseries) (2012)

Producer
The Wonder Years (96 episodes, 1989–1993) (executive producer)
The Days and Nights of Molly Dodd (1987-1989) (supervising producer)
Raising Caines (1995) (executive producer)
Early Edition (1996-2000) (executive producer, developer, executive consultant)
Ed (1 episode, 2000) (consulting producer)
Karen Sisco (1 episode, 2004) (executive producer)
111 Gramercy Park (2003) (executive producer)
Scruples (miniseries) (2012) (executive producer)

References

External links

Brush on working on The Wonder Years
Rolling Stone article on Wonder Years Oral History
Wonder Years Retrospective

American television producers
American television writers
American male television writers
Emmy Award winners
Living people
Year of birth missing (living people)